Neolimnia is a New Zealand genus of flies in the family Sciomyzidae, the marsh flies or snail-killing flies.

Species
 Subgenus Neolimnia Tonnoir & Malloch, 1928
N. castanea (Hutton, 1904)
N. diversa (Hutton, 1904)
N. irrorata Tonnoir & Malloch, 1928
N. minuta Tonnoir & Malloch, 1928
N. obscura (Hutton, 1901)
N. pepekeiti Barnes, 1979
N. raiti Barnes, 1979
N. striata (Hutton, 1904)
 Subgenus Pseudolimnia Tonnoir & Malloch, 1928
N. repo Barnes, 1979
N. sigma (Walker, 1849)
N. tranquilla (Hutton, 1901)
N. ura Barnes, 1979
 Subgenus Sublimnia Harrison, 1959
N. nitidiventris Tonnoir & Malloch, 1928
N. vittata Harrison, 1959

References

Sciomyzidae
Sciomyzoidea genera